Leimbach may refer to:

Places
 Leimbach, Haut-Rhin, commune in Haut-Rhin, France
 Leimbach, Aargau, municipality in Switzerland
 Leimbach (Zürich), quarter of the city Zürich in Switzerland
 in Germany:
 Leimbach, Thuringia, in the Wartburgkreis
 Leimbach, Ahrweiler, in the district of Ahrweiler, Rhineland-Palatinate
 Leimbach, Bitburg-Prüm, in the district of Bitburg-Prüm, Rhineland-Palatinate

Rivers
 in Germany:
 Leimbach (Rhein-Neckar), of  Baden-Württemberg, tributary of the River Rhine
 Leimbach (Dhünn), of North Rhine-Westphalia, tributary of the Dhünn
 Leimbach (Wupper), of North Rhine-Westphalia, tributary of the Wupper
 Leimbach (Wehre), of Hesse, tributary of the Wehre

People
 August Leimbach (1882–1965), German-American sculptor
 Marti Leimbach (born 1963), American fiction writer
 Karl Ludwig Leimbach (1844–1905), German educator and literary historian

Other uses
 Leimbachstadion, a stadium in Siegen, Germany
 Leimbach Park, a linear park and flood prevention scheme under construction in Wiesloch, Germany